Kuruppinte Kanakkupusthakam (English: Kurup's ledger/account book) is a 1990 family-drama Indian Malayalam film, directed by Balachandra Menon and produced by his wife Varada Balachandra Menon. The film stars Balachandra Menon, Jayaram, Geetha and Parvathy Jayaram in the lead roles. The film has musical score by Balachandra Menon.

Plot
It is the story of a strict brother who has made himself a business magnate and is very much into everyone's life around him. He has certain moral attitudes and stubbornness, but the softness and the child inside him is seen by no one, and to an extent he does not show it.

Cast
 
Balachandra Menon as Vinayachandra Kurup
Jayaram as Shanthan
Geetha as Vasantha
Parvathy Jayaram as Beena  
Sukumari as Vasantha's mother
Kaviyoor Ponnamma as Vinayan, Shanthan and Sathi's mother
Thikkurissy
Sankaradi as Vasantha's father 
Janardhanan as Beena's brother-in-law
Mamukkoya as Ali Khan
Monisha as Sathi
Oduvil Unnikrishnan as Gangadharan 
Sai Kumar as Girish
Thodupuzha Vasanthi as Servant

Soundtrack
The music was composed by Balachandra Menon.

References

External links
  
 

1990 films
1990s Malayalam-language films
Films directed by Balachandra Menon